Melica geyeri is a species of grass known by the common name Geyer's oniongrass.

Distribution
Melica geyeri is native to the western United States, where it is found in Oregon and California, including the Sierra Nevada. It grows in many types of habitat, including mountain forests and open hillsides.

Description
Melica geyeri is a rhizomatous perennial grass growing up to 2 meters in maximum height. The base of the stem swells into onionlike corms. The inflorescence is a wide array of long, narrow, pointed spikelets which are green with purple banding.

External links
Jepson Manual Treatment - Melica geyeri
Grass Manual Treatment
Melica geyeri - Photo gallery

geyeri
Bunchgrasses of North America
Native grasses of California
Grasses of the United States
Flora of Oregon
Flora of the Cascade Range
Flora of the Klamath Mountains
Flora of the Sierra Nevada (United States)
Natural history of the California chaparral and woodlands
Natural history of the California Coast Ranges
Flora without expected TNC conservation status